
Year 16 BC was either a common year starting on Monday, Tuesday or Wednesday or a leap year starting on Monday or Tuesday (link will display the full calendar) of the Julian calendar (the sources differ, see leap year error for further information) and a common year starting on Sunday of the Proleptic Julian calendar. At the time, it was known as the Year of the Consulship of Ahenobarbus and Scipio (or, less frequently, year 738 Ab urbe condita). The denomination 16 BC for this year has been used since the early medieval period, when the Anno Domini calendar era became the prevalent method in Europe for naming years.

Events 
 By place 

 Roman Empire 
 The Noricans having joined with the Pannonians in invading Histria, are defeated by Publius Silius Nerva, proconsul of Illyricum.
 Braga, Portugal is founded.
 Noricum is incorporated into the Roman Empire.
 Caesar Augustus reorganizes the German provinces, making Trier their capital.
 Clades Lolliana: Roman consul Marcus Lollius is defeated by a Germanic horde.
 Construction of the Roman temple of Maison Carrée at Nîmes in Gallia Narbonensis (approximate date).

Births

Deaths 
 Aemilius Macer, Roman didactic poet and writer
 Scribonius, Roman client king of the Bosporan Kingdom
 Wang, Chinese empress of the Western Han Dynasty

References